Hyperallergic is an online arts magazine, based in Brooklyn, New York. Founded by the art critic Hrag Vartanian and his husband Veken Gueyikian in October 2009, the site describes itself as a "forum for serious, playful, and radical thinking".

Publisher
Hyperallergic is published by Veken Gueyikian.

Reception
Hyperallergic LABS, its Tumblr blog, was named by Time magazine as one of the "30 Tumblrs to Follow in 2013". The New Yorker critic Peter Schjeldahl has described the site as "infectiously ill-tempered". Holland Cotter of the New York Times has also praised the site, crediting it with a revival in popular art criticism. The publication was cited by the TED blog as one of "100 Websites You Should Know and Use" in 2007. In 2018, Nieman Reports published an article outlining how Hyperallergic came to rival print art journalism, in which Sarah Douglas, the ARTnews editor in chief, said that Hyperallergic had reinvigorated art criticism.

Staff
Co-Editor-in-chief & co-founder: Hrag Vartanian
Co-Editor-in-chief: Valentina Di Liscia
News editor: Hakim Bishara
Editor: Natalie Haddad
Editor: Dan Schindel
Editor: Albert Mobilio
Editor: Thomas Micchelli
Editor: John Yau
Poetry editor: Wendy Xu
Editorial coordinator: Lakshmi Rivera Amin
Staff Writer: Jasmine Liu
Staff Writer: Elaine Velie
Marketing Manager: Alexandra Bowditch
Marketing Coordinator: Shari Flores
Ad Ops Coordinator: Kristina Chang

Contributing writers

Dorian Batycka
Monica Castillo
Alexander Cavaluzzo
Bedatri D. Choudhury
Alicia Eler
Lucas Fagen
Daniel Gerwin
Edward M. Gomez
Alissa Guzman
Anthony Hawley
Daniel Larkin
Megan N. Liberty
Colony Little
Kirsten O'Regan
Elisa Wouk Almino
Ellie Duke

Joseph Nechvatal
Cassie Packard
Michael Press
Lauren Purje
Laura Raicovich
Renée Reizman
Christine Ro
Seph Rodney
Barry Schwabsky
John Seed
Mark Sheerin
Jack Sjogren
Melissa Stern
Matt Stromberg
Ben Valentine
Jasmine Weber

References

External links

Visual arts magazines published in the United States
Online magazines published in the United States
Magazines established in 2009
Internet properties established in 2009
Magazines published in New York City
2009 establishments in New York City